Swiss Movement is a soul jazz live album recorded on June 21, 1969 at the Montreux Jazz Festival in Switzerland by the Les McCann trio, with saxophonist Eddie Harris and trumpeter Benny Bailey.  The album was a hit record, as was the accompanying single "Compared to What", with both selling millions of units.

Reception and influence

The album was nominated for a Grammy Award in the category of best jazz performance, small group. It reached No. 1 on Billboard'''s jazz album chart, No. 2 on the R&B chart, and No. 29 on the LP chart.Whitburn, Joel (1991) "The Billboard Book of Top 40 Albums". Billboard Books. p. 119.

A Billboard writer commented in 2006 that "what put Montreux on the recorded-live-in-concert map was the legendary Swiss Movement album". Writing in AllMusic, Richie Unterberger calls Swiss Movement "one of the most popular soul jazz albums of all time, and one of the best."

The tapes of this impromptu concert were originally recorded by the festival's organisers and then passed on to Atlantic, who decided to release them after paying a fee of less than 100 dollars.

McCann and Harris teamed up again for a follow-up recording, Second Movement'', released in 1971.

Track listing
"Compared to What" – (Gene McDaniels): 8:41
"Cold Duck Time" – (Eddie Harris): 6:31
"Kathleen's Theme" – (Les McCann): 5:45
"You Got It in Your Soulness" – (Les McCann): 7:08
"The Generation Gap" – (Les McCann): 8:45
"Kaftan" - (Leroy Vinnegar) – bonus track on the 1996 reissue:

Personnel
Eddie Harris – tenor saxophone
Les McCann – piano, vocals on "Compared to What"
Benny Bailey – trumpet
Leroy Vinnegar – bass
Donald Dean – drums

References 

Albums produced by Nesuhi Ertegun
1969 live albums
Rhino Records live albums
Les McCann live albums
Eddie Harris live albums
Albums recorded at the Montreux Jazz Festival
Atlantic Records live albums
Live soul jazz albums